Tammy Townley (born November 27, 1965) is an American politician who has served in the Oklahoma House of Representatives from the 48th district since 2018.

References

1965 births
Living people
Republican Party members of the Oklahoma House of Representatives
21st-century American politicians
21st-century American women politicians
Women state legislators in Oklahoma